Graciela Limón (born August 2, 1938 Los Angeles) is a Latina/Chicana novelist and a former university professor. She has been honored with an American Book Award and the Luis Leal Award for Distinction in Chicano/Latino Literature.

Limón has written critical work on Mexican, Latin American and Caribbean literature. She now concentrates her writing efforts on creative fiction that is germane to her areas of interest: feminism, social justice and cultural identity.

Her body of work includes In Search of Bernabé, which won The Before Columbus Foundation American Book Award (1994). Limón also published The Memories of Ana Calderón (1994), Song of the Hummingbird (1996) and The Day of the Moon (1999). Erased Faces, which was awarded the 2002 Gustavus Myers Book Award, was published in 2001; Left Alive was released in 2005; The River Flows North in 2009, and The Madness of Mamá Carlota in 2012. Her latest book is The Intriguing Life of Ximena Godoy, published by Cafe con Leche Books.

Life
Graciela Limón was born in East Los Angeles where her parents settled after immigration from Mexico. She always dreamed of becoming a novelist from an early age but that dream slowly started to fade once she reached college. She graduated from Marymount College (now Loyola Marymount University), Fundación Universidad de las Américas, Puebla with a master's degree, and from University of California Los Angeles with a PhD in Spanish American Literature.

She is a professor emeritus of Loyola Marymount University, where she taught U.S. and Hispanic literature and also served as chair of the Department of Chicano and Chicana Studies. She attempted to publish a collection of her essays, but every editor she went to rejected them. This caused her to spend some time in depression.

She is currently a professor at the University of California, Santa Barbara and University of California, Los Angeles. She teaches courses in Latina/Chicana narratives, border narratives, and contemporary Latin American literature.

Limón has been an activist in Chicano work as well as in the areas of gender and women's affairs. Sheimón has published nine novels, all of which deal with a Latina and trans-border experience.

Awards
 1994, The Before Columbus Foundation American Book Award
 2002, Gustavus Myers Outstanding Book Award
 2009, Luis Leal Award for Distinction in Chicano/Latino Literature

Works

Anthologies

References

External links
  http://www.gracielalimon.com

1938 births
20th-century American novelists
21st-century American novelists
American women novelists
Writers from Los Angeles
Loyola Marymount University faculty
University of California, Santa Barbara faculty
Loyola Marymount University alumni
Universidad de las Américas Puebla alumni
University of California, Los Angeles alumni
Living people
20th-century American women writers
21st-century American women writers
American Book Award winners
American women academics